Prorophora albidogilvella is a species of snout moth. It is found in China (Inner Mongolia Autonomous Region, Gansu) and Mongolia.

The wingspan is 15–18 mm.

References

Phycitinae
Moths described in 1970